Criollos de Caguas, Spanish for "Caguas Creoles", is the name of three professional sport teams of Caguas, Puerto Rico:

 Criollas de Caguas, a women's volleyball team in the Liga de Voleibol Superior Femenino
 Criollos de Caguas (baseball), a baseball team in the Puerto Rico Baseball League
 Criollos de Caguas (basketball), a basketball team in the Baloncesto Superior Nacional
 Criollos de Caguas FC, a football team that joined the Puerto Rico Soccer League for the 2009 season

See also
 Caguas (disambiguation)
 Criollos (disambiguation)